Dendrosporobacter is a genus in the phylum Bacillota (Bacteria). Members of the class Negativicutes, stain gram negative, despite being firmicutes

Etymology
The name Dendrosporobacter derives from:Greek noun dendron, tree; Greek noun spora (σπορά), a seed, and in biology a spore; New Latin noun, a rod bacter, nominally meaning "a rod", but in effect meaning a bacterium, rod, staff; New Latin masculine gender noun Dendrosporobacter, a spore-bearing rod from a tree.

Species
The genus contains a single species, namely D. quercicolus ( (Stankewich et al. 1971) Strömpl et al. 2000,  (Type species of the genus).; Latin noun quercus, oak; New Latin masculine gender adjective quercicolus, intended to mean associated with oak trees).

See also
 Bacterial taxonomy
 Microbiology
 List of bacterial orders
 List of bacteria genera

References

Bacteria genera
Taxa described in 2000
Negativicutes
Monotypic bacteria genera

Bacteria described in 1971